The Supercopa de Baloncesto 2004 was disputed in Málaga, Andalusia and began with the following semifinals.

Semifinals
September 25, 2004:

TAU Cerámica 75 - 76  Real Madrid : (Official Match Recap)

Unicaja 62 - 70  FC Barcelona : (Official Match Recap)

Third and Fourth Place
September 26, 2004:

 Unicaja 70 - 56 TAU Cerámica : (Official Match Recap)

Final
September 26, 2004:

Real Madrid 75 - 76 (OT)  FC Barcelona : (Official Match Recap)

MVP: Dejan Bodiroga of FC Barcelona

See also
 Supercopa de España de Baloncesto
 ACB

External links
 Official website

Supercopa de España de Baloncesto
2004–05 in Spanish basketball